Harrisburg Christian School  is a private, coeducational Christian elementary, middle school and high school, located on the north side of the greater Harrisburg, Pennsylvania area in the village of Linglestown, Pennsylvania. The school was founded in 1955 by parents who believed "responsibility for the educational instruction of their children according to Scripture was theirs, not the states". Harrisburg Christian School is not operated by a local church, but has independent status, being “owned” by The Christian School Association of Greater Harrisburg. School parents and employees make up the membership of this Association.

The school was located in as many as five different rented locations around the greater Harrisburg area between 1955 and 1965 before building its own elementary school building on its current location at 2000 Blue Mountain Parkway in Linglestown

Over the next forty years additions to the original building, the construction of two new buildings, and improvements to the school grounds have created an attractive and safe school campus.

Harrisburg Christian School offers an educational program that integrates the historic Christian Faith into a college-preparatory academic program of instruction.  HCS employs 30 full and part-time teachers with a total employee base of 47.  The student enrollment for the 2007-08 school year is 290. HCS’s teacher-student ratio is 1:12.

References

 Celebrating God’s Vision and Faithfulness: A 50 Year History of Harrisburg Christian School.  Joseph D. Fausnight, Jr.,   author.

1955 establishments in Pennsylvania
Christian schools in Pennsylvania
Educational institutions established in 1955
Preparatory schools in Pennsylvania
Private elementary schools in Pennsylvania
Private high schools in Pennsylvania
Private middle schools in Pennsylvania
Schools in Dauphin County, Pennsylvania